This is a list of prisons and other secure correctional facilities in Canada, not including local jails.

In Canada, all offenders who receive a sentence of 24 months or greater must serve their sentence in a federal correctional facility administered by the Correctional Service of Canada (CSC). Any offender who receives a sentence less than 24 months, or who is incarcerated while awaiting trial or sentencing, must serve their sentence in a provincial/territorial correctional facility.

Members of the Canadian Armed Forces who are sentenced under military law serve their sentences at detention barracks designated by the Department of National Defence. For inmates with serious mental health conditions, CSC has 5 regional treatment centres.

In addition, CSC also provides healing lodges specifically for Indigenous offenders, designed with the intention "to address factors that led to their incarceration and prepare them for reintegration into society." CSC currently funds and/or operates 10 healing lodges across Canada, while others are operated by local Indigenous communities or partner organizations.

Ontario
Provincial correctional facilities in Ontario are administered by the province's Ministry of the Solicitor General.

Quebec
In Quebec, provincial correctional facilities are administered by the province's Ministry of Public Security (French: Ministère de la Sécurité publique).

Atlantic
The Atlantic Region consists of four provinces: Nova Scotia, New Brunswick, Prince Edward Island, and Newfoundland and Labrador.

Prairie
The Prairie Region consists of the provinces of Manitoba, Saskatchewan, and Alberta, as well as Northwestern Ontario and the Northwest Territories.

Pacific
The Pacific Region consists of the province of British Columbia and the Yukon Territory.

Provincial correctional facilities in BC are administered by B.C. Corrections under the province's Ministry of Attorney General. Meanwhile, those in the Yukon are administered by Yukon Corrections.

Nunavut

References

 
Canada
Prisons